Arman "Gino" Hall (born February 12, 1994) is an American sprinter specializing in the 400m. He is a World and Olympic gold medalist as a member of USA's 2014 and 2016  relay teams.

He attended St. Thomas Aquinas High School in Fort Lauderdale, Florida. Hall was raised in Pembroke Pines, Florida and lived with his mother, father and older brother. Hall was an All-USA high school track and field team selection by USA Today in 2011. He won the 400 metres at the 2011 World Youth Championships in Athletics in Lille Métropole, France. Hall also ran the 2011 youth world-leading over 200 metres the same year.

Hall verbally committed to the University of Florida on December 5, 2011, and joined the Gators track team in the fall of 2012. During his collegiate career, Hall was a 3-time NCAA champion, 10-time Outdoor All-American and 7-time Indoor All-American. While at the University of Florida, Hall majored in African American studies.

During his freshman year, at just 19 years old, Hall placed 3rd at the 2014 USA Outdoor Track and Field Championships in the 400m. He went on to represent USA at the 2014 IAAF World Athletics Championships in the open 400m and as part of the 4X400m relay.

In 2016, he earned Olympic gold as lead-off for Team USA's  relay at the 2016 Summer Olympics. Earlier in 2016, he won the NCAA Men's Division I Outdoor Track and Field Championships  title in the 400m.

Hall currently trains in Phoenix, Arizona.

References

External links
 
 
 
 
 
 
 Arman Hall at DyeStat (ESPN)
 Florida Gators bio

1994 births
Living people
Track and field athletes from Miami
Sportspeople from Fort Lauderdale, Florida
People from Pembroke Pines, Florida
American male sprinters
Florida Gators men's track and field athletes
Athletes (track and field) at the 2016 Summer Olympics
Olympic gold medalists for the United States in track and field
Medalists at the 2016 Summer Olympics
World Athletics Championships winners
St. Thomas Aquinas High School (Florida) alumni